The 1985 Jacksonville State Gamecocks football team represented Jacksonville State University as a member of the Gulf South Conference (GSC) during the 1985 NCAA Division II football season. Led by first-year head coach Bill Burgess, the Gamecocks compiled an overall record of 3–6–1 with a mark of 3–5 in conference play, and finished tied for sixth in the GSC.

Schedule

References

Jacksonville State
Jacksonville State Gamecocks football seasons
Jacksonville State Gamecocks football